The Velikonda Range or Velikonda Hills is a low mountain range, that form part of the Eastern Ghats mountain range system, in eastern India. 

The Velikonda Range is located in the south-eastern part of Andhra Pradesh state.

Mountains of Andhra Pradesh
Eastern Ghats
Mountain ranges of India